Micropholis emarginata is a species of plant in the family Sapotaceae. It is endemic to Brazil.  It is threatened by habitat loss.

References

Flora of Brazil
emarginata
Endangered plants
Taxonomy articles created by Polbot